Leonardo Luiz dos Santos (born 3 June 1994), simply known as Léo, is a Brazilian footballer who plays for Nongbua Pitchaya as a defender.

Career statistics

References

External links

1994 births
Living people
Brazilian footballers
Association football defenders
Campeonato Brasileiro Série B players
Campeonato Brasileiro Série D players
Ituano FC players
Associação Atlética Ponte Preta players
Léo Santos
Léo Santos